Yuliya Berberyan-Maleeva (born 6 October 1944) is a former Bulgarian tennis player. She and her husband, Georgi Maleev, had three daughters, Manuela, Katerina, and Magdalena, who were coached by their mother and won 40 WTA singles tournaments combined. Each were ranked in the top ten on the WTA Tour during their careers.

References

External links
 
 
 

1944 births
Bulgarian female tennis players
Living people
Bulgarian people of Armenian descent